100% Uggla, subtitle: Absolut inget annat is a compilation album by Swedish pop and rock artist Magnus Uggla. His third compilation album, it was released in October 1994.

Track listing
 "Jag mår illa" - 4:06
 "Varning på stan" - 4:41
 "Fula gubbar" - 4:17
 "4 sekunder" - 4:05
 "IQ" ("Blue Blue (Victoria)") - 3:32
 "Jag skiter" - 3:24
 "Ska vi gå hem till dig" - 5:08
 "Baby Boom" - 5:29
 "Astrologen" - 5:09
 "Joey Killer" - 4:29
 "Vittring" - 3:08
 "Dansar aldrig nykter" - 3:39
 "Staffans matematik" - 4:53
 "Centrumhets" (Metro Jets) - 4:03
 "Mälarö kyrka" - 3:05
 "Passionsfrukt" - 3:49
 "Mitt decennium" - 4:32
 "Hand i hand" - 4:39

Charts

References 

1994 greatest hits albums
Magnus Uggla compilation albums
Swedish-language compilation albums